Psohlavci may refer to:
 Psohlavci , an 1894 novel by Alois Jirásek
 Dog's Heads, a 1955 Czech drama film, based on the novel
 Psohlavci (opera), a Czech-language opera, based on the novel